Pingtan railway station is a railway station in Pingtan County, Fuzhou, Fujian, China. Located on Pingtan Island, it is the terminus of the Fuzhou–Pingtan railway. It opened with the line on 26 December 2020.

References

Railway stations in Fujian
Railway stations in China opened in 2020